Hemal Gunasekara (born 25 December 1959) is a Sri Lankan politician educated at St Sylvester's College, Kandy and a current Member of Parliament for Matara District.

References

Sri Lanka Parliament profile

1959 births
Living people
Provincial councillors of Sri Lanka
Members of the 14th Parliament of Sri Lanka
Sinhalese politicians